Peppermint, or Miss Peppermint (born 1979), is an American actress, singer, songwriter, television personality, drag queen, and activist. She is best known from the nightlife scene and, in 2017, as the runner-up on the ninth season of RuPaul's Drag Race. In 2018, Peppermint made her debut in The Go-Go's-inspired musical Head Over Heels as Pythio, becoming Broadway's first out trans woman to originate a lead role.

As a recording artist, she has released two studio albums, Hardcore Glamour, released in 2009, and Black Pepper, released in 2017, as well as five EPs, including A Girl Like Me: Letters to My Lovers, which was released in 2020.

Early life
Peppermint was raised in Hershey, Pennsylvania, and Wilmington, Delaware. She felt her gender non-conformity was policed, so she tried to fit in with others' expectations. She transitioned after moving to New York City and came out in 2012, before she appeared on RuPaul's Drag Race. While a contestant on Drag Race, Peppermint revealed that when she had been a high-school cheerleader, she had been beaten up by a male member of her high school's basketball team.

Career

Early work 
Peppermint started performing as a child in youth theatre, playing roles at Opera Delaware, Delaware Children's Theatre, and The Brandywiners Community Theatre. She continued performing at Wilmington High School where she was also on the cheerleading team. For a time, she also worked as a makeup artist for MAC Cosmetics.

Peppermint moved to New York City to study musical theatre at AMDA. While in college she got a job at the nightclub Tunnel's Kurfew parties, ultimately becoming a fixture in New York City nightlife. She started recording music in 2005 for Jonny McGovern's mixtape Jonny McGovern Presents: This is NYC, Bitch! The East Village Mixtape. She contributed the song "Servin' It Up", which was produced by Adam Joseph. The song was later released as Peppermint's debut single in 2006.

Peppermint was featured in the web series Queens of Drag: NYC by gay.com in 2010. The series featured fellow New York drag queens Bianca Del Rio, Dallas DuBois, Hedda Lettuce, Lady Bunny, Mimi Imfurst, and Sherry Vine. She also appeared as a drag-version of Tyra Banks on America's Next Top Model Cycle 14, Episode 5: "Smile and Pose" introducing a drag-theme runway challenge at Lucky Chengs in New York City.

RuPaul's Drag Race 

Peppermint talked about being trans publicly for the first time on an episode of The Daily Show called "The Trans Panic Epidemic" in April 2016.

On February 2, 2017, Peppermint was announced as one of the fourteen contestants on the ninth season of RuPaul's Drag Race. Though other transgender women have competed on RuPaul's Drag Race, she was the first to have come out prior to the show airing, having come out in 2012.

She won the Roast Challenge in episode 8. She placed in the bottom two in two challenges, lip-synching to Madonna's "Music" and the Village People's "Macho Man", winning both. Her performances earned her the favorable nickname "Lip Sync Assassin". Ultimately, she finished in second place after winner Sasha Velour, after they both lip-synced to Whitney Houston's "It's Not Right but It's Okay (Thunderpuss Remix)".

Music
Peppermint's debut studio album Hardcore Glamour was self-released in 2009 and preceded by the singles "Servin' It Up" and "Thought Ya Knew". In 2011, Sherry Vine and Peppermint released a parody of the Lady Gaga and Beyoncé song "Telephone" titled "Make Me Moan". Following the viral success of the music video, Peppermint later released other parody songs, including a parody of Azealia Banks' song "212", titled "21/12". Her song "If I Steal Your Boyfriend" was used in the 2011 film Eating Out 5: The Open Weekend.

On April 3, 2017, Peppermint released a six-track EP of remixes of various songs she had released up to that point, including the single "Dolla in My Titty". Her second studio album Black Pepper was released in June of the same year. A three-song EP with producer Cazwell called Blend was released in 2018. In 2019, Peppermint appeared on fellow Drag Race alum Trinity the Tuck's single "I Call Shade", which charted at number 13 on the Billboard Comedy Digital Tracks chart.

On February 11, 2020, it was announced that Peppermint was working on a new album, and the lead single "What You're Looking For" was released on February 14, 2020. In an interview with Entertainment Tonight on August 28, 2020, Peppermint stated that the album would in fact be a trilogy of EPs, and that a full studio album was previously planned for a May 2020 release, but was delayed due to the ongoing COVID-19 pandemic. The first of these EPs, A Girl Like Me: Letters to My Lovers, will be released on October 16, 2020, with the lead single "Best Sex" being released on October 2. Of the project, she said "it really does focus on my life -- who I am as a trans woman -- and everything that's happening right now [with] Black Lives Matter, Black Trans Lives Matter and a lot of the issues that we are dealing with socially." She also confirmed that the project would feature collaborations with Laith Ashley, Jerome Bell, Daniel Shevlin of Well-Strung, Matt Katz-Bohen of Blondie, Corey Tut and Adam Joseph.

The EP garnered Peppermint a nomination for Outstanding Music Artist at the 2021 GLAAD Media Awards.

Acting

Peppermint made her Broadway debut in The Go-Go's-inspired musical Head Over Heels using the songs of The Go-Go's. The plot of the show is somewhat based on The Countess of Pembroke's Arcadia written by Sir Philip Sidney in the 16th century. The show began previews in June 2018 and officially opened July 2018, at the Hudson Theatre; playing the role of Pythio, Peppermint became the first trans woman to originate a principal role on Broadway.

Writing for Deadline Hollywood, Greg Evans summed up his impression of the musical as "occasionally amusing, occasionally cloying", expressing disappointment that many popular Go-Go's songs appeared to have been flattened over the years the musical spent in development. In Entertainment Weekly, Kelly Connolly viewed the show more favorably, praising "the charismatic cast" and Michael Mayer's "joyful production"; she gave the A− score overall. The New York Timess critic Ben Brantley's review drew criticism as transphobic and misgendering of Peppermint's character. The Times subsequently edited the review and Brantley apologized for it, writing that he had tried to "reflect the light tone of the show". The show closed in January 2019.

Peppermint has had appearances on Pose and Saturday Night Live, and in October 2019 played the role of Pastor Olivia, "the [transgender] leader of an LGBTQ-friendly congregation", in a two-episode arc of God Friended Me.

Continued career 
From 2019 to 2020, she co-hosted It's a Mess podcast with Cazwell.

Peppermint is a co-founder of Black Queer Town Hall along with Bob The Drag Queen. The inaugural event featured speakers such as Laverne Cox and Angela Davis and raised over $270,000 for The Okra Project.
 
On June 2, 2021, Peppermint was announced as a cast member of OUTtv's Call Me Mother, where her and fellow "Drag Mothers" Crystal and Barbada de Barbades adopt and mentor up-and-coming drag talent over an eight-week journey as they compete to win the title of "First Child Of Drag" and a $50,000 prize package. In the show, Peppermint will be representing the House of Dulcet.

Public image
She does not use her birth name, and asks that publications not deadname her. For several years, she went by the name "Angel", which derived from her portraying Angel in a one-act production of Rent.

Discography

Studio albums

EPs

Singles

As lead artist

As featured artist

Other appearances

Music videos

Parody music videos

Filmography

Film

Television

Audio series

Web series

Music video appearances

Theatre credits

See also
 LGBT culture in New York City
 List of LGBT people from New York City

References

External links 
 

1979 births
Living people
21st-century American actresses
21st-century American singers
21st-century American women singers
Actresses from Pennsylvania
Actresses from Wilmington, Delaware
African-American actresses
African-American drag queens
African-American songwriters
African-American women singers
American house musicians
American singer-songwriters
American women singer-songwriters
Contemporary R&B singers
LGBT African Americans
American LGBT actors
LGBT hip hop musicians
LGBT people from Delaware
LGBT people from Pennsylvania
American LGBT singers
Nightlife in New York City
People from Hershey, Pennsylvania
RuPaul's Drag Race contestants
Transgender actresses
Transgender women musicians
Transgender drag performers
Transgender rights activists
Participants in Canadian reality television series
Transgender singers